St. George's Square is located at Prague Castle in Prague, Czech Republic.

External links

 

Prague Castle
Squares in Prague